Waldemir Moka (born October 10, 1951) is a Brazilian politician and doctor. He has represented Mato Grosso do Sul in the Federal Senate since 2011. Previously, he was a Deputy from Mato Grosso do Sul from 1999 to 2011. He is a member of the Brazilian Democratic Movement Party.

References

Living people
1951 births
Members of the Federal Senate (Brazil)
Brazilian Democratic Movement politicians

Brazilian people of Arab descent